The Sommerfeld identity is a mathematical identity, due Arnold Sommerfeld, used in the theory of propagation of waves, 

where

is to be taken with positive real part, to ensure the convergence of the integral and its vanishing in the limit  and
.
Here,  is the distance from the origin while  is the distance from the central axis of a cylinder as in the  cylindrical coordinate system. Here the notation for Bessel functions follows the German convention, to be consistent with the original notation used by Sommerfeld. The function  is the zeroth-order Bessel function of the first kind, better known by the notation  in English literature.
This identity is known as the Sommerfeld Identity.

In alternative notation, the Sommerfeld identity can be more easily seen as an expansion of a spherical wave in terms of cylindrically-symmetric waves:

Where

The physical interpretation is that a spherical wave can be expanded into a summation of cylindrical waves in  direction, multiplied by a two-sided plane wave in the  direction; see the Jacobi-Anger expansion. The summation has to be taken over all the wavenumbers .

The Sommerfeld identity is closely related to the two-dimensional Fourier transform with cylindrical symmetry, i.e., the Hankel transform. It is found by transforming the spherical wave along the in-plane coordinates (or) but not transforming along the height coordinate .

Notes

References 
 
 

Mathematical identities
Wave mechanics